Hermathena is a genus of butterflies in the family Riodinidae containing a total of three known species. A small Neotropical genus of uncommon montane butterflies. The larvae feed on bromeliads.

Species
Hermathena candidata Hewitson, 1874
Hermathena eburna Hall & Harvey, 2005
Hermathena oweni Schaus, 1913

References

External links

Tree of Life web project: Hermathena
Hermathena - Butterflies and Moths of the World
Hermathena genus information by Markku Savela

Riodinidae
Butterfly genera
Taxa named by William Chapman Hewitson